The Roebuck Tavern is a historic tavern at 21 Dedham Street in Wrentham, Massachusetts.  The two-story Federal style structure was built in 1795 by David Fisher, whose family was one of the earliest to settle the area in the 17th century.  Fisher operated a tavern, which would have been successful, as Wrentham was then a stop on the stagecoach route between Boston and Providence, Rhode Island.  The building remained in the Fisher family until 1910.

The tavern was listed on the National Register of Historic Places in 1984.

See also
National Register of Historic Places listings in Norfolk County, Massachusetts

References

Taverns in Massachusetts
Drinking establishments on the National Register of Historic Places in Massachusetts
Buildings and structures in Norfolk County, Massachusetts
National Register of Historic Places in Norfolk County, Massachusetts
Wrentham, Massachusetts